The Genuang was a Malaysian railway halt located at and named after the town of Genuang, Segamat District, Johor.

KTM Intercity train services were only provided at this halt, the station will be a freight station after the completion of Gemas-JB EDTP project.

See also
 Rail transport in Malaysia

KTM ETS railway stations
Segamat District
Railway stations in Johor